Let Sleeping Corpses Lie (Do Not Profane the Sleep of the Dead; ,  Do Not Profane the Sleep of the Dead), also known as The Living Dead at Manchester Morgue and Don't Open the Window, is a 1974 Spanish-Italian science fiction zombie horror film written and directed by Jorge Grau and starring Ray Lovelock, Arthur Kennedy and Cristina Galbó. It focuses on two protagonists who are harassed by a local police investigator in the English countryside and are implicated in murders committed by zombies who have been brought to life by a farming tool designed to kill insects via ultra-sonic radiation.

After being presented at the Sitges Film festival in Spain on September 30, 1974, the film was released in Italy on 28 November 1974 and was later released throughout 1975 in the United States and the United Kingdom under varying titles. In total, the film was released under more than 15 different titles internationally. In the following years, the film has become a cult picture.

Plot
George is taking a trip from an antique shop in Manchester to the Lake District. On the way, his Norton motorcycle is accidentally damaged by Edna while reversing her Mini Cooper at a petrol station. He demands she give him a lift to his destination, while Edna, on her way to visit her troubled sister, asks to go to the town of Southgate first, and to let George take her car to Windermere where she will later retrieve it.

George agrees, but the two come to a dead end road alongside a river while searching for Edna's sister's house. George crosses the river on foot to a farm where several men from the Ministry of Agriculture are using an experimental machine in a field. While asking for directions, he inquires about their machinery, which they explain is designed to kill insects through ultra-sonic radiation. Meanwhile, while Edna waits at the car, she is attacked by a man who emerges from the river. She runs to find George for help, but her attacker is gone when they return to the car.

Night falls and the film shifts focus: Edna's sister, Katie, is shown awaiting Edna's arrival, and is revealed to be addicted to heroin. Katie gets into an argument with her photographer husband, Martin, about her sister's impending arrival. Martin goes down to a waterfall near their remote cottage to complete a night-shoot of some plant specimens. Meanwhile, Katie, while preparing to take heroin, is attacked by the same man who Edna had encountered earlier. Katie is pursued to Martin's photo-shoot, where the man kills Martin, and Katie flees just as George and Edna arrive. When the three report the death, the aggressive police sergeant suspects foul-play from the trio. George, forced to stay in Southgate as a person-of-interest to the investigation, secretly takes the roll of film from Martin's camera to a local chemist to have it developed. Katie has a breakdown and is hospitalised. Visiting the hospital, babies are acting strangely, biting and scratching people with homicidal intensity.

Back at the chemist's, George and Edna collect the photos, but the dead man does not appear in any of the pictures; the man, it turns out, is a local vagrant who drowned in the river. The sergeant arrives and confiscates the photos and, when the couple leaves, sends one of his officers, PC Craig, to follow them. They go to the graveyard and in a room in the chapel find a half-eaten meal. Following noises to a crypt, they come across the vagrant's casket empty, along with a murdered man. Locked into the crypt by an unseen figure, they again encounter the zombified vagrant, who brings the other bodies to life by touching their eyes with his blood-stained fingers. The pair manage to make their escape along a ladder, kicking out a hole to climb into a freshly-dug grave.  PC Craig arrives and helps Edna out of the pit. George follows and the trio are then pursued by the zombies into the church itself. They lock themselves in a room but are trapped there, with PC Craig finding his gun is of no use against the zombies. He makes a dash for the police radio he has dropped outside but is caught by the zombies who kill and devour him.

The dead break into their room and in desperation George throws a lit oil lamp at them. It smashes and the zombies burst into flame. The two escape to their car and Edna is sent off to tell the police. George heads to the experimental agricultural machine, where the farmer and two government men do not believe George, and reveal that the machine is now working with a newly effective five-mile radius. They try to stop him, but he smashes the machine.

Meanwhile, the sergeant has found Craig and the caretaker's bodies, and thinking Edna and George may be devil worshippers, issues orders "to shoot to kill". He is then told that George has deliberately wrecked the machine. Edna has arrived at her brother-in-law's farm only to be met by Martin, who is now a zombie, but she manages to run over him as she escapes. George finds her, drops her off at a petrol station and drives off with a large can of petrol. George is caught in a police trap and Martin's body is taken back to the hospital.

In a field, the machine is repaired and switched on again, which brings to life a number of bodies in the nearby hospital morgue. George escapes in a police car and finds Edna has been taken to the hospital. At the hospital, the zombies are now killing people, including Katie who as a zombie tries but fails to kill her sister with scissors.

George arrives and sets  fire to all of the zombies. Realising Edna has also become a zombie, he pushes her into a burning room. The police arrive, and George is then shot by the police sergeant, who laments that he wishes it were true that the dead could return to life, if only because he would then be able to shoot George again. Returning to his hotel room for the night, the sergeant finds a zombified George waiting for him in his room. In a field nearby, the machine continues working.

Cast
Cristina Galbó as Edna Simmonds
Ray Lovelock as George Meaning
Arthur Kennedy as The Inspector
Aldo Massasso as Kinsey
Giorgio Trestini as Craig
Roberto Posse as Benson
José Lifante as Martin West
Jeannine Mestre as Katie West
Gengher Gatti as Keith
Fernando Hilbeck as Guthrie Wilson
Vera Drudi as Mary
Vicente Vega as Dr. Duffield
Francisco Sanz as Perkins
Paul Benson as Wood
Anita Colby as Nurse

Production

The story is set in the English countryside near Windermere, but was primarily filmed in Italy. The scenes featuring the outside of the hospital were shot at Barnes Hospital in Cheadle, Greater Manchester. Some scenes were filmed in the Peak District in Derbyshire, not far from Sheffield, principally in Castleton which stands in for Southgate, and the dramatic Winnat's pass, which has the church superimposed onto it. The church scenes were shot in Hathersage. The opening montage was filmed in Manchester city centre.

Release
The film premiered in Spain on 30 September 1974, in Italy on 28 November 1974, and was released in the United States in 1975 under the title Don't Open the Window, frequenting the drive-in circuits and cinemas paired as a double feature with The Last House on the Left (1972). The film was released in the United Kingdom under its title The Living Dead at the Manchester Morgue, despite the fact that the film takes place in South Gate, not Manchester.

While there are claims that a scene in which a zombie eats an eyeball was filmed, no such scene exists in any surviving print of the film, according to the liner notes of the Blue Underground DVD release. During the scene in which Craig is eaten, the female zombie reaches down toward Craig's eyeball, but before anything happens, a seemingly sloppy edit cuts to a long shot of all the zombies feasting. It is part of the DVD Stephen Romano Presents Shock Festival, which was released on 8 January 2010 in the United States.

According to Edgar Wright, the promotion of the film during its exhibition in the United States was one of the inspirations for the fake trailer Don't, which appears in the 2007 release Grindhouse.

Home media
The film was released for the first time on video and DVD in the U.S in 2000 by Anchor Bay Entertainment under the Let Sleeping Corpses Lie title. The DVD release was available in a standard edition as well as a limited edition collector's tin containing bonus film stills, a booklet of production notes, and a fake toe tag styled after the film. Both editions featured a foreword and extensive interview with director Jorge Grau.

After the Anchor Bay release of the film went out of print, the disc was re-released by Blue Underground in 2005. In 2008, Blue Underground released the film yet again, only this time in a special edition DVD and Blu-ray under the Living Dead at the Manchester Morgue title. On 27 June 2019, Synapse Films announced an upcoming Blu-ray release featuring a new 4K resolution scan of the original 35mm film negatives . It was released on September the 1st 2020 in a limited steelbook edition of 6 000 units.

Reception

From a contemporary review, Verina Glaessner of the Monthly Film Bulletin said the film was extremely close to Night of the Living Dead but praised the direction of Jorge Grau, referring to him as a "director with genuine talent for the macabre mood and unsettling detail"

Rotten Tomatoes, a review aggregator, reports that 86% of 21 surveyed critics gave the film a positive review; the average rating was 7.35/10.  Writing in The Zombie Movie Encyclopedia, academic Peter Dendle called it "surprisingly effective" and said it has "perhaps the best zombies in a year of very good zombies".  Zombiemania: 80 Movies to Die For author Arnold T. Blumberg said that the movie "manages to sustain interest thanks to a creepy droning soundtrack, some excellent suspenseful sequences and the requisite over-the-top gore," adding that the film "earns a place in zombie movie history by being one of the first to feature an onscreen gut-ripping feasting scene with zombies actually tearing into a living victim." Glenn Kay, who wrote Zombie Movies: The Ultimate Guide, said that it foreshadowed the later Italian zombie films of the 1980s.  Kay called it "the most effective and disturbing Spanish film of the period".

In popular culture 
A sample of dialogue from the film appears in the track "Wizard in Black" by Electric Wizard on their 1997 album Come My Fanatics…

A song by the melodic death metal group Carcass named "The Living Dead at the Manchester Morgue", named after one of the film's English titles, was released on their 2020 Despicable EP.

The film's American titles, has been cited as the main inspiration for the name of the Edgar Wright short film, Don't.

References

Works cited

External links
 
 
 

1974 films
1974 horror films
1970s science fiction horror films
Italian independent films
Italian science fiction horror films
Spanish zombie films
Spanish independent films
Spanish science fiction horror films
English-language Italian films
English-language Spanish films
1970s Italian-language films
1970s Spanish-language films
Italian zombie films
Films set in the Lake District
Films shot in Madrid
Video nasties
1974 independent films
Films shot in Greater Manchester
1970s English-language films
1970s Italian films
1970s Spanish films